Alla Aleksandrovna Alekseyeva (born 7 December 1934) is a retired Russian rower who won a European title in the coxed fours in 1966. She graduated from the Moscow State University and after retiring from competitions worked as editor.

References

1934 births
Living people
Russian female rowers
Soviet female rowers
Moscow State University alumni
European Rowing Championships medalists